Queen Ingrid's Hospital is a hospital in Nuuk, Greenland. The hospital not only serves as the main hospital for the municipality but is the central hospital in all of Greenland. The hospital has 185 beds.  There is a 12-bed psychiatric ward.  Some forensic patients have to be transferred to a special ward in Denmark.

History
The hospital was established in 1953 and initially was a sanatorium for pulmonary diseases.

Architecture
The current hospital complex dates from 1980 but is currently being expanded and rejuvenated according to a plan by C. F. Møller Architects.

The first phase which consists of a health centre and pharmacy opened on 3 February 2011. It take the form of sunken angular blocks and is clad in copper both on the facades and roof. The design is inspired by the ice floes that float in Godthåbsfjord and the image of Sermitsiaq,  a 1210 meters high mountain and local landmark, symbol for Nuuk municipality before municipal mergers in 2009, however Sermitsiaq is not Greenland's highest mountain, (Gunnbjørn Fjeldet, 3694 meter high in Eastgreenland is the highest in Greenland).

Also planned are a psychiatric building, rural pharmacy and a new medical clinic for general practitioners as well a circular patient ‘hotel’ with additional beds.

References

External links 
 Queen Ingrid's Hospital

Hospital buildings completed in 1953
Hospital buildings completed in 1980
Hospitals in Greenland
Buildings and structures in Nuuk
Tuberculosis sanatoria